Asterix: The Mansions of the Gods, also titled Asterix and Obelix: Mansion of the Gods, is a 2014 French 3D computer-animated adventure family comedy film directed by Louis Clichy with a story written and co-directed by Alexandre Astier.  It is based on the Asterix comic book The Mansions of the Gods, which was the seventeenth book in the  comic book series Asterix by Goscinny and Uderzo. The film features the voices of Roger Carel, and Florence Foresti. The film was Carel's last film before his retirement and later death. It was the first Asterix film animated in 3D.

The film was theatrically released on 26 November 2014 by SND Films in France across 696 movie theatres. It received generally favourable reviews and has grossed over $51 million on a €31 million budget. It received an IFMCA Award nomination for Best Original Score for an Animated Feature Film. Asterix: The Mansions of the Gods was released on DVD, VOD and Blu-ray on 9 June 2015, by M6 Vidéo.

Plot
Frustrated with the ongoing rebellion of the Gauls, Julius Caesar devises a new scheme to conquer them: the construction of a city of luxury apartments dubbed “The Mansions Of The Gods” in the forest near the Gauls' village as a means to absorb them into Roman civilization.

During a boar hunt, Asterix and Obelix discover the Mansions’ construction site. Project leader and architect Squaronthehypotenus and the Roman legion commanded by Centurion Somniferus order slaves to deforest the surrounding area. Asterix and Obelix attempt to counteract the Romans’ efforts using magic acorns from Getafix the druid, which instantly sprout into full trees upon planting.

Upon hearing the frustrated Squaronthehypotunus threatening to work the slaves to death, Asterix and Obelix invade the Roman camp to free the slaves and provide them with the Gauls' magic potion as a means to escape. This backfires however when the slaves instead use it to rapidly advance construction, as well as barter for the same pay as the legionaries, along with their freedom and apartments for each of them upon completion. The legionaries also go on strike for similar reasons upon hearing about it.

The Gauls prepare to attack and demolish the Mansions, but discover it to already be populated by Roman civilians. Realizing that they cannot harm the civilians, they return to the village to plan how to make them leave. Meanwhile, Anonymus, Dulcia and Mischiefus, a family from Rome, are denied their apartments given to them in a lottery due to lacking documents. Upon encountering and befriending Obelix and Dogmatix in the forest, the Gauls reluctantly agree to temporarily accommodate the Roman family

Asterix, Obelix and Getafix try numerous methods to make the civilians leave, from causing heavy rain and noise pollution, to trying to create a noxious stench, only for these to backfire by the civilians embracing these as a natural part of life in Brittany. The Roman civilians also begin shopping in the village, causing an escalating price war over fish and 'antique' weaponry. Asterix, appalled with what the village has become, leaves with Obelix, Getafix, Dogmatix and Cacofonix to get their own apartment at the Mansions. While Squaronthehypotenus is reluctant to allow their stay, Senator Prospectus allows them to stay as part of Caesar's plan.

Caesar then enacts the next phase of the plan by offering free apartments to the Gauls. In another attempt to make the Roman civilians leave, Asterix has Cacofonix to sing deafeningly loud outside the mansions. This almost works until the rest of the Gauls shows up to silence Cacofonix and move into their new apartments.

Caesar begins the final part of his plan, razing the village. The legion, however refuses to cooperate with Getafix and Obelix still at large. Getafix, Mischiefus and Dogmatix are captured and held in the Mansions' reception, while Obelix faints from hunger next to the Roman legion while searching for the three, and is thrown into a chamber beneath the Mansions.

Asterix awakens the next day to find the village being besieged, and the Gauls are brought along to watch the village's destruction. The Gauls keep the Romans at bay by pretending to still possess the magic potion, while Asterix makes his way to the Mansions. Meeting with Anonymus and Dulcia, they are able to free Getafix, Dogmatix, and Mischiefus and escaping into the apartments, Getafix brews the magic potion from ingredients in each of the rooms. The Gauls chase the Romans back to the Mansions, only to be captured once the Romans realise their deception. Asterix attempts to rescue them, but ends up in a poor condition from consuming an incomplete magic potion.

Caesar and Prospectus arrive to declare victory over the Gauls, until Obelix rises from underground, revived after consuming food from an arrival banquet disposed into his chamber. The Gauls get their magic potion and defeat the Romans in battle, and demand Caesar take the civilians to head back to Rome, finally leading to the demolition of the Mansions of the Gods. In tradition, the Gauls celebrate their victory with a banquet atop the ruins of the mansions. Back in Rome, Anonymus and Mischiefus get even on Caesar by throwing one of Getafix's acorns into his podium at the Colosseum, leaving him dangling from a tree branch.

Cast

Critical response and box office

The film was released on 26 November 2014 in France across 696 theatres and earned $7.64 million on its opening week from nearly 780,000 admissions placing at No. 1 at the box office ahead of Hollywood blockbuster films The Hunger Games: Mockingjay – Part 1 and Interstellar which were in their second and fourth weeks respectively. The film's opening weekend is also the third highest of 2014 in France. Its opening weekend outperformed other animated movies' openings of Frozen, Tangled, Monsters, Inc., Cars and The Lego Movie. Jordan Mintzer of The Hollywood Reporter said, "Astier and Clichy manage to make the material at once enjoyable and meaningful, while also providing a series of slick, streamlined visuals that never overstuff the screens."

Awards and nominations

Home media release
Asterix: The Mansions of the Gods was released on DVD, VOD and Blu-ray on 9 June 2015 by M6 Vidéo.

Sequels 
In 2018, a sequel was released titled Asterix: The Secret of the Magic Potion.

References

External links
 

2014 films
2014 3D films
2014 computer-animated films
2010s French animated films
Belgian animated films
Belgian comedy films
French adventure comedy films
French 3D films
2010s French-language films
2010s adventure comedy films
Animated adventure films
Animated comedy films
Asterix films
Animated films based on comics
Belgian children's films
French children's films
French computer-animated films
3D animated films
Films directed by Alexandre Astier
2014 comedy films
French animated fantasy films
French alternate history films